Davide Cinaglia (born 10 April 1994) is an Italian professional footballer who plays as a centre back for  club Juve Stabia.

Club career

Early career
Born in Rome, he was part Roma youth system for three years before moving to Pomezia in 2008, then Pro Roma the following year. In 2010, he was noticed by observers of Torino who aggregated him to their Allievi Nazionali youth team coached by Moreno Longo.

In August 2013 he was sold to Lega Pro side FeralpiSalò under a co-ownership agreement. In his first season as a professional, he collected 19 appearances and on 22 June 2014 his contract was redeemed by Torino.

Ascoli

On 1 September 2014 he was sold to Lega Pro side Ascoli, collecting 17 appearances in the Italian third division during the 2014–15 season. With the promotion of the Bianconeri, he made his debut in Serie B the following year in a 1–0 defeat of Virtus Entella.

Cremonese
On 9 January 2018 he was signed by Cremonese.

Gubbio
On 2 September 2019, he signed a two-year contract with Gubbio.

Juve Stabia
On 27 July 2021, he joined Juve Stabia.

International career
He has represented Italy at under-19 levels.

References

External links

 AIC profile (data by football.it) 

1994 births
Living people
Footballers from Rome
Italian footballers
Association football central defenders
Serie B players
Serie C players
Torino F.C. players
FeralpiSalò players
Ascoli Calcio 1898 F.C. players
U.S. Cremonese players
Novara F.C. players
A.S. Gubbio 1910 players
S.S. Juve Stabia players
Italy youth international footballers